Nannhausen Airfield (or Flugplatz Nannhausen in German) is a small airstrip in Nannhausen, Germany. It is located along the B50 between Simmern and Kirchberg and is close to the much larger Frankfurt Hahn Airport. It has a single grass runway in the direction 06 / 24 with a length of 560 meters (1,837 feet).

See also

 Transport in Germany
 List of airports in Germany

External links
Airliners.net - photos taken at Nannhausen Airfield

Airports in Rhineland-Palatinate
Rhein-Hunsrück-Kreis